The Groningen Student Rowing Club Aegir (Dutch: Groninger Studenten Roeivereniging Aegir) (GSR Aegir) is a Dutch rowing club, founded 7 February 1878 as a subsidiary organization of Vindicat atque Polit, a Groningen Student Corporation.
GSR Aegir is located at the Winschoterdiep, and, as of 2009, has 500 members.

Aegir has won The Varsity, a student rowing event of The Netherlands modelled on the Oxford and Cambridge Boat Race, a total of 6 times.

For the 1972 Summer Olympics GSR Aegir provided the whole crew for the Dutch eight. In recent years Aegir rower Reinder Lubbers was part of the Olympic Crew.

Rowing Races
GSR Aegir organises a few rowing events each year. 
Martini Regatta - Aegir organises this rowing event in collaboration with A.G.S.R. Gyas and the Royal Groningen Rowing Club 'De Hunze' 
Hel van het Noorden - A time trial race for the single scull or coxless pair.
Studenten Roeiregatta Groningen - A rowing race exclusive for students in the Netherlands.
Chris Heuvelman Wielerclassic - A road bicycle racing event.

Honours

Henley Royal Regatta

References

External links
 

1878 establishments in the Netherlands
Rowing clubs in the Netherlands
Sports clubs established in 1878
Sports clubs in Groningen (city)